North Star BASIC was a dialect of the BASIC programming language for the Intel 8080 microprocessor used on the North Star Horizon and available for purchase on other S-100 bus machines of the late 1970s.

Overview
The BASIC interpreter was implemented by Dr. Charles A. Grant and Dr. Mark Greenberg, of North Star Computers, Inc.

One notable difference with other dialects of BASIC of the time was the way in which substrings were addressed using an array-like syntax, a concept sometimes referred to as "slicing". This string addressing technique is analogous to the one used in Fortran, and was introduced to BASIC with HP Time-Shared BASIC and later used on Atari BASIC and Sinclair BASIC, among others. Strings could be of any length, limited only by available memory, but had to be "ensioned" before use.

While the language was very similar to other BASICs overall, one interesting addition was the addition of an  keyword to pop out of a  loop.

Most other differences were minor.  was supported, but the alternate form  was not. The language used the backslash (\) instead of a colon to delimit statements on a single line.

Version 5 was assembled for 8-digit floating-point precision. North Star would re-assemble the interpreter for customers with a different precision, up to 14 digits.

Some other dialects of BASIC were created that were based on and inspired by North Star BASIC, such as BaZic (a rewrite of North Star BASIC, taking advantage of the faster Zilog Z80 instructions), Megabasic and S.A.I.L.B.O.A.T. (a basic optimized for Z80 and X86 MS-DOS). Some of these were available for other hardware and operating systems, including Unix, CP/M and DOS.

References

Citations

Bibliography

External links
North Star BASIC manual, Version 5
The User's Guide to North Star BASIC

BASIC programming language family